The pinktail triggerfish (Melichthys vidua) is a species of triggerfish from reefs in the Indo-Pacific. It is very dark green (often appears almost black) with translucent whitish-pink dorsal and tail fins. It is also found in the aquarium trade.

References

External links
 Fishes of Australia : Melichthys vidua
 

pinktail triggerfish
Fish of Palau
Fish of Hawaii
pinktail triggerfish